Altaf Hossain (-3 May 2009) Bangladesh Nationalist Party politician. He was elected a member of parliament from Bagerhat-4 in 1986.

Early life 
Altaf Hossain was born in about 1934 in Bagerhat District.

Career 
Altaf Hossain was a lawyer. He served as Union Parishad Chairman for a long time and Morelganj Upazila Chairman. In 1962, he was elected a member of the then East Pakistan Provincial Council and appointed Parliamentary Secretary. he was elected to parliament from Bagerhat-4 as a Jatiya Party candidate in 1986 Bangladeshi general election. After that he joined BNP and was nominated as a member of the central committee.

He was defeated from Bagerhat-4 constituency on 12 June 1996 on the nomination of Bangladesh Nationalist Party.

Death 
Altaf Hossain died on 3 May 2009 while undergoing treatment at Bangladesh Medical College and Hospital.

References 

1930s births
2009 deaths
People from Bagerhat District
Bangladesh Nationalist Party politicians
3rd Jatiya Sangsad members